Adriano Pedro Bessa da Costa (born 18 December 1976), known as Bessa, is a Portuguese retired footballer who played as a right back.

Football career
Bessa was born in the village of Alvarães, Valongo. An unsuccessful FC Porto youth graduate, he represented during his career C.F. União de Lamas, C.D. Nacional, Gil Vicente F.C., Vitória de Guimarães (his most successful period in the Primeira Liga, although he was rarely a starter during his four-year spell), Associação Naval 1º de Maio, Boavista F.C., C.D. Trofense, Gondomar S.C. and S.C. Espinho.

In the top division, Bessa amassed totals of 145 games and five goals. He retired in June 2011 at the age of 34, after one season apiece in the third division with Gondomar and Espinho.

External links

1976 births
Living people
Portuguese footballers
Association football defenders
Primeira Liga players
Liga Portugal 2 players
Segunda Divisão players
C.F. União de Lamas players
C.D. Nacional players
Gil Vicente F.C. players
Vitória S.C. players
Associação Naval 1º de Maio players
Boavista F.C. players
C.D. Trofense players
Gondomar S.C. players
S.C. Espinho players